Fifteen is an unincorporated community in Washington County, in the U.S. state of Ohio.

History
A variant name is Fifteen Mile. The community was so named on account of its location,  from Marietta. A post office called Fifteen was established in 1872, and remained in operation until 1918.

References

Unincorporated communities in Washington County, Ohio
Unincorporated communities in Ohio